Jinnur is a village in Dharwad district of Karnataka, India.

Demographics 
As of the 2011 Census of India there were 400 households in Jinnur and a total population of 1,757 consisting of 886 males and 871 females. There were 226 children ages 0-6.

References

Villages in Dharwad district